Sonsveien holdeplass is a railway halt on the Østfold Line in south-eastern Norway near the village of Son in Vestby municipality. It is served by hourly commuter trains operated by Vy on line R21 between Moss and Oslo.

History
The station was opened in 1996 when the line between Ski and Moss was double-tracked. There had been an earlier Son station on the old single-track line.

External links
Station information from railway infrastructure company Bane NOR 

Railway stations in Akershus
Railway stations on the Østfold Line
Railway stations opened in 1996
1996 establishments in Norway
Vestby